Simon Grand (born 23 February 1984) is an English footballer who plays as a defender for Charnock Richard.

He notably played in the Football League for Rochdale, Carlisle United, Grimsby Town, Morecambe and Aldershot Town, and in non-league football for Northwich Victoria, Fleetwood Town, Southport, Mansfield Town, AFC Telford United, Barrow, Salford City, AFC Fylde and Chester.

Career

Rochdale
Born in Chorley, Grand started his career at Rochdale as a trainee in August 2001 and won the club's Young Player of the Year award in May 2002.
He made his debut in a 2nd round FA Cup tie against Bristol Rovers in December 2002 and established himself in the first team, making 28 appearances in all competitions in the remainder of the 2002–03 season and helping Rochdale to the 5th round of the FA Cup in February 2003 where they were beaten by Wolves.
He began the 2003–04 season in the first team and was a regular until January 2004 when, having made 21 appearances in all competition, he was dropped from the side following the arrival of new manager Steve Parkin.
He made no further appearances for Rochdale and was released by the club in May 2004.

Carlisle United
Grand joined Conference National club, Carlisle United, in August 2004, after a successful trial.
He scored on his debut against Tamworth in September 2004 and made 29 appearances in all competitions in the 2004–05 season as Carlisle won promotion to the Football League. Shortly before the end of the season, he signed a two-year contract keeping him at the club until 2007.
In December 2005, he scored the match winning penalty as Carlisle beat Tranmere Rovers 11–10 on penalties in the Football League Trophy.
However, he found it hard to get ahead of Kevin Gray, Danny Livesey and Peter Murphy in the centre back position and made only 14 appearances in the 2005–06 season as Carlisle clinched a second successive promotion as League Two champions. At the end of the season, Carlisle were willing to listen to offers for Grand and, after making a further six appearances for Carlisle in the 2006–07 season, he joined Grimsby Town.

Grimsby Town
Grand joined Grimsby Town in January 2007, initially on loan until the end of the 2006–07 season but signing a permanent 18-month deal two weeks later. However, after making only seven appearances for Grimsby, he was released in May 2007.

Morecambe
Grand joined Football League newcomers Morecambe in August 2007 on a 12-month deal, after a successful trial with the Christie Park club.

Non-League
After leaving Morecambe in the close season, Grand signed for Northwich Victoria on non-contract terms in August 2008. He signed a permanent contract until the end of the 2008–09 season in October. Grand signed for Fleetwood Town prior to the start of the 2010–11 season. In October 2010, he joined Mansfield Town on loan making 9 appearances in the Conference League and FA Cup. In January 2011, he joined Aldershot Town on loan.

Prior to the start of the 2011–12 season Grand moved down the west coast of England to join Southport on a free transfer and made his competitive club debut on 13 August 2011 on the first day of the 2011–12 season. He scored his first Southport goal, heading their second goal in a 3–2 away win over Forest Green.
Grand scored 3 more goals for Southport in the 2011–12 season, also captaining the side on occasion in the absence of club captain, Alan Moogan. On 28 June 2012, Grand was appointed Southport's new club captain, following Moogan's move to becoming player/coach.

Following his release from Southport, it was announced on the club site he joined Telford on 10 May 2013, linking up again with Liam Watson. On 26 April 2014 he won promotion to the Conference Premier with Telford after they clinched the Conference North title on the final game of the season.

On 20 May 2014, Grand joined Barrow, and was named as team captain in August 2014 for the upcoming 2014–15 season.

In July 2016 he joined Salford City.

He subsequently joined AFC Fylde.

In July 2018, Grand signed for Chester He was released at the end of the 2021–22 season.

In July 2022, Grand signed on for North West Counties Premier Division side Charnock Richard, and scored an equaliser against Padiham on his debut.

Career statistics

Honours

Player

Individual
Conference North Team of the Year: 2014–15

References

External links

Living people
1984 births
Sportspeople from Chorley
English footballers
Association football defenders
Rochdale A.F.C. players
Carlisle United F.C. players
Grimsby Town F.C. players
Morecambe F.C. players
Northwich Victoria F.C. players
Fleetwood Town F.C. players
Southport F.C. players
Mansfield Town F.C. players
Aldershot Town F.C. players
AFC Telford United players
Barrow A.F.C. players
English Football League players
National League (English football) players
Salford City F.C. players
AFC Fylde players
Chester F.C. players